The name Alma has been used to name 11 tropical cyclones worldwide: 5 in the North Atlantic Ocean, 5 in the Eastern Pacific Ocean, and 1 in the Western Pacific Ocean.

In the Atlantic:
 Tropical Storm Alma (1958), made landfall in northeastern Mexico
 Hurricane Alma (1962), struck North Carolina as a tropical storm before heading out to sea
Hurricane Alma (1966), a Category 3 hurricane that traversed Cuba and then made landfall near Apalachee Bay, Florida; killed 90, mostly in Honduras, and did $210 million damage (in 1966 dollars), mostly to Cuba
 Hurricane Alma (1970), made landfall as a depression near Cedar Key, Florida 
 Tropical Storm Alma (1974), made landfall in Venezuela, caused 47 indirect deaths from a plane crash on Isla Margarita

In the Eastern Pacific:
 Tropical Storm Alma (1984), never affected land
 Hurricane Alma (1990), earliest Pacific hurricane on record, but never affected land
 Hurricane Alma (1996), affected Mexico with heavy rainfall, causing at least three deaths
 Hurricane Alma (2002), early season major hurricane that never affected land
 Tropical Storm Alma (2008), made landfall on the Pacific coast of Nicaragua
The WMO retired the name Alma after the 2008 hurricane season and replaced it with Amanda beginning in 2014. 

In the Western Pacific:
 Typhoon Alma (1946), approached Japan

Atlantic hurricane set index articles
Pacific hurricane set index articles
Pacific typhoon set index articles